Events from the year 1864 in Sweden

Incumbents
 Monarch – Charles XV

Events

 The Skandinaviska Banken founded.
 The newspaper Dagens Nyheter begins its publication.
 June 18 – The Decree of Extended Freedom of Trade introduce complete freedom of trade in Sweden: unmarried women are granted the same rights within trade and commerce as men.
 Husbands are forbidden to abuse their wives.
 The gymnastics profession is open to women.
 Queen Louise and Princess Louise take lessons in ice skating from the pioneer Nancy Edberg, making ice skating socially acceptable for females.
 Bertha Valerius appointed official photographer of the royal court.
 Women students are admitted as students at the Royal Swedish Academy of Arts without having to apply for a dispensation.
 Foundation of the Statens normalskola för flickor.
 The famous trip of the Sami Maria Magdalena Mathsdotter to Stockholm.

Births

 20 January – Mathilda Malling, novelist (died 1942).
 12 March – Alice Tegnér, composer (died 1943).
 25 June – Ola Hanson, missionary (died 1927).
 20 July – Erik Axel Karlfeldt, poet (died 1931).
 27 November – Gustaf Boivie, sport shooter (died 1951).
 3 December – Anna Boberg, artist (died 1935).
 17 December – Felix Körling, composer (died 1937).
 18 December – Per-Olof Arvidsson, sport shooter (died 1947).

Deaths
 2 January – Johan Gabriel Richert, jurist and politician (born 1784).
 2 March –  Brita Catharina Lidbeck, singer (born 1788).
 28 May – Charlotta Deland, stage actress (born 1807).
 4 November – Lotten Wennberg, philanthropist (born 1815).
 Wendla Åberg, dancer and actress (born 1791).

References

 
Sweden
Years of the 19th century in Sweden